John Snodgrass may refer to:

John F. Snodgrass (1804–1854), U.S. Representative from Virginia
John Snodgrass (diplomat) (1928–2008), British diplomat
John James Snodgrass (1796–1841), British military officer

See also
Jon Snodgrass (born 1941), author from Panama
Jon Snodgrass (musician)